Ambohitantely Special Reserve is a  wildlife reserve of Madagascar.

Geography
The entrance to the reserve is on route 4, near the village of Arazana and the nearest hotel is at Ankazobe.

The ethnic groups living in and around the reserve are the Betsileo, Betsimisaraka, and Merina peoples.

Flora and fauna
The main habitats of the reserve are primary rainforests and grassland savannah. The black-bark tree, Fanola (Asteropeia amblyocarpa) is registered as critically endangered on the IUCN Red List, and Schizolaena tampoketsana with its twisted fissured trunk is believed to have only 160–370 mature individuals in existence. Sihara palm (Dypsis onilahensis), Manambe palm (Dypsis decipiens), and rosewood (Dalbergia monticola) are all registered as vulnerable species.

Three lemur species are found in the reserve: brown mouse lemur (Microcebus rufus), eastern woolly lemur (Avahi laniger), and common brown lemur (Eulemur fulvus). Rare birds found in the reserve include the Malagasy harrier (Circus macrosceles) and Madagascar ibis (Lophotibis cristata). The frog Anodonthyla vallani is likely occurs only within the reserve.

The reserve is the only known habitat of the critically endangered Darth Vader giant pill millipede (Zoosphaerium darthvaderi).

Threats
The area is threatened with Slash-and-burn agriculture and irrigation for rice paddies.

References

External links
 Madagascar National Parks

1982 establishments in Madagascar
Analamanga
Special reserves of Madagascar
Protected areas established in 1982
Madagascar subhumid forests